Tsav or Tzav may refer to:

Tsav, Armenia, a town
Tzav, one of Judaism's Weekly Torah portions
Tzav ikuv, an Israeli court order